Gilbert Tuyihimbaze is a Burundian professional footballer who plays as a forward for Guêpiers du Lac in the Burundi Football League.

International career
He was invited by Lofty Naseem, the national team coach, to represent Burundi in the 2014 African Nations Championship held in South Africa.

References

Living people
1993 births
2014 African Nations Championship players
Burundian footballers
Association football forwards
Burundi A' international footballers